Travail.Suisse is a trade union federation in Switzerland.

History
The federation was formed in December 2002 by the merger of the Christian National Union Confederation (CNG) and the Confederation of Swiss Employees' Associations (VSA). Through the CNG, Travail.Suisse traces into roots back to 1907.  Initially, the federation represented around 170,000 workers.

Affiliates

Current affiliates

Former affiliates

References

External links
 

Trade unions in Switzerland
Trade unions established in 2002